Katako'kombe Airport  is an airstrip serving the town of Katako'kombe in Democratic Republic of the Congo.

See also

Transport in the Democratic Republic of the Congo
List of airports in the Democratic Republic of the Congo

References

External links
OpenStreetMap - Katako'kombe Airport
OurAirports - Katako'kombe
Katako'kombe Airport
HERE Maps - Katako'kombe

Airports in Sankuru